The Washington Park Clubhouse is located in Kenosha, Wisconsin.

History
The clubhouse services a public golf course, which was opened in 1922. In part, the clubhouse was a Works Progress Administration project. The building was added to the State Register of Historic Places in 2002 and to the National Register of Historic Places the following year.

References

Clubhouses on the National Register of Historic Places in Wisconsin
Sports venues on the National Register of Historic Places in Wisconsin
National Register of Historic Places in Kenosha County, Wisconsin
Golf clubs and courses in Wisconsin
Buildings and structures in Kenosha, Wisconsin
Works Progress Administration in Wisconsin
Tudor Revival architecture in Wisconsin
Brick buildings and structures
Sports venues completed in 1936